"Anasazi" is the twenty-fifth episode and season finale of the second season of the American science fiction television series The X-Files. It was written by series creator Chris Carter based on a story he developed with lead actor David Duchovny. The episode was directed by  R. W. Goodwin, and featured guest appearances by Peter Donat, Nicholas Lea, Mitch Pileggi and Floyd Red Crow Westerman. The episode helped explore the overarching mythology, or fictional history of The X-Files. "Anasazi" earned a Nielsen household rating of 10.1, being watched by 9.6 million households in its initial broadcast; and received positive reviews from critics.

The show centers on FBI special agents Fox Mulder (David Duchovny) and Dana Scully (Gillian Anderson) who work on cases linked to the paranormal, called X-Files. In this episode, Mulder and Scully come into possession of a tape containing classified government files, and attempt to decipher its contents. Meanwhile, Mulder's mental health begins to deteriorate, and a mysterious corpse is discovered on a New Mexico reservation. "Anasazi" is part of a three-episode storyline, with the plot carrying on in the third season episodes "The Blessing Way" and "Paper Clip".

Series creator Chris Carter worked closely with series star David Duchovny, who shares a story credit with Carter for the episode.

Plot 

In the desert on a Navajo Indian reservation in New Mexico, a teenage boy comes across a boxcar buried in the ground. He retrieves the corpse of an alien-like figure from the boxcar, which he takes back to the reservation and presents to the residents, including a Navajo elder named Albert Hosteen.

Shortly afterward, Kenneth Soona, a computer hacker known as "The Thinker", breaks into the Defense Department database and downloads secret files related to extraterrestrial life, putting them onto a digital tape. When the Syndicate, a secretive group of government officials, learns of the breach, the Smoking Man tells them that he has already resolved the matter, although this is a lie; in fact, notification of such a development was "the phone call [he] never wanted to get." The Lone Gunmen visit Mulder and inform him that Soona wants to meet with him and are interrupted by the sound of a gunshot. When Mulder goes out to his apartment hallway to investigate, he finds that one of his neighbors has shot her husband.

Soona gives the digital tape to Mulder at a discreet meeting in a park. An excited Mulder returns to FBI headquarters, only to find that the tape is encrypted. Scully believes the encryption is based on the Navajo language and takes the tape in order to investigate. When Skinner calls Mulder to his office to question him about the tape, Mulder physically attacks him. Scully is brought before an FBI panel led by Skinner and is questioned about Mulder's actions. Scully is told that Mulder faces dismissal from the FBI, and that she will suffer a similar punishment if she has lied to them.

On Martha's Vineyard, the Smoking Man visits Mulder's father, Bill, and informs him of his son's likely possession of the tape. Scully meets with a Navajo translator, who refers her to a code talker. Mulder is called away to see Bill; when Scully arrives at his apartment, she is grazed by a bullet shot through his window. When Mulder arrives at Bill's residence, his father prepares to reveal the truth about everything. However, Bill is shot and mortally wounded by Alex Krycek. When Mulder contacts Scully, she tells him to flee the scene. After Mulder arrives at her apartment, Scully takes his gun from him while he sleeps.

Scully brings the gun to the FBI for comparison against the bullet that killed Bill. When Mulder awakens, he becomes angry and suspicious towards Scully. Later returning to his building, Scully finds his water being contaminated. As Mulder is entering in his building, he spots Krycek, whom he disarms and prepares to kill. However, Scully shoots him to prevent him from doing so, allowing Krycek to escape. Scully brings an unconscious Mulder to New Mexico and, when he awakens, reveals that his behavior was caused by a drug placed into his water supply and that she shot him because if he had killed Krycek, it then would have been harder to prove his innocence in his father's death. She then introduces him to Hosteen, who has been translating the files on the tape.

Scully reveals that the tape contains information on both her and Duane Barry. Hosteen introduces Mulder to his grandson, who drives him to the buried boxcar. Just before Mulder heads in, he is called by the Smoking Man, who is able to trace Mulder's location through the call. Mulder heads inside the boxcar, finding a pile of the dead creatures, each with smallpox vaccination scars on their arms. The Smoking Man arrives by helicopter with eight armed commandos and, not finding Mulder inside, orders the boxcar to be burned.

Production 

Series creator Chris Carter noted that the episode's creation "was the culmination of a lot of ideas. Generally, when we pitch stories to the staff everyone comments on them, and Darin Morgan called this the kitchen sink episode, because it had so much in it, he didn't know how we would pull it off. But I'm very proud of the script. David Duchovny and I worked quite closely on the story and he had a lot of input, and then I sat down and wrote the script". He felt that the episode ended the season in the best manner possible, asking more questions than it answered. The episode tried to make similar cliffhangers as the previous season finale, with revelations such as Mulder's father being part of the conspiracy and later killed to "prove anything could happen in  The X-Files".
 
The painting of the quarry was achieved with a series of cranes, and required the permission of local environmental groups. When early seasons of the show were re-released in 16:9 widescreen for home video and streaming services in 2016, this practical effect became noticeable as sections of gray, unpainted quarry were visible at the edges of the frame which would not have been viewable on 4:3 televisions at the time of the original broadcast.

To create the impression of a buried train carriage, a depression had to be blown into the ground and thirty-two dump trucks worth of debris removed. Series creator Chris Carter makes a cameo appearance in this episode as one of the senior FBI agents questioning Scully.  The tagline for this episode is Éí 'Aaníígóó 'Áhoot'é, which means "The Truth is Out There" in Navajo.

Reception

This episode earned a Nielsen rating of 10.1, with an 18 share, meaning that roughly 10.1 percent of all television-equipped households, and 18 percent of households watching television, were tuned in to the episode. It was viewed by 9.6 million households.

In a retrospective of the second season in Entertainment Weekly, "Anasazi" was rated an A, being described as "mind-blowing if frustrating", with it being noted that the episode "made fans want to fast-forward through summer." Writing The A.V. Club, Zack Handlen rated the episode an A−, noting that the episode "has a lot of really strong moments" and praising Duchovny's acting. However, he felt that the episode marked the point at which the series' overarching mythology would begin to lose focus, explaining that "it's troubling that instead of answering any big issues here ... the show only gives us new directions". Chris Carter said of the episode, "I'm proud of the way it came together, what it did for the series, and the overwhelmingly positive response it has gotten. I'm very pleased beginning season three with where this episode put us—which is that it posed more questions than it answered." He later said in 2005 that the episode brought a lot of interest to the show due to the apparent death of agent Mulder. The episode, along with both other parts of the story arc, were listed concurrently as the second-best episode of the series by Den of Geek's Nina Sordi. Sordi noted that the plotline "laid the groundwork for the mythology arc for the rest of the series", adding that it "brought much more significance to what is to come".

Some reviewers have critiqued the treatment of indigenous peoples and culture in the episode. While writing a largely positive review of the episode, Jess Camacho of Multiversity Comics argued that "Anasazi" is "awful when it comes to dealing with Native American people, specifically their very valid conflicts with the U.S. government. It has really fallen back on some stereotypes and doesn't do very well in handling things." Likewise, Eleanor Hersey, in an article published in the Journal of Popular Film & Television argues that "The X-Files is certainly guilty of romanticizing and stereotyping the Navajo" in the episode.

Footnotes

Bibliography

External links 

"Anasazi" on TheXFiles.com
 

1995 American television episodes
Television episodes written by Chris Carter
Television episodes set in Delaware
Television episodes set in Massachusetts
Navajo Nation
Television episodes set in New Mexico
Television episodes set in New York (state)
The X-Files (season 2) episodes